Tando Hyder is a town and union council of Hyderabad District in the Sindh province of Pakistan. It is part of the rural Taluka of Hyderabad  and is located at 25°22'60N 68°25'60E and lies to the east of the capital Hyderabad.
In local government  Election 2015 chairman Mansoor azeem
Vice chairman muhammad Asif khanzada
Census 2018 population of Union councils tandohyder 26626

References

Union councils of Sindh
Populated places in Sindh